Muhammad Shahidullah (10 July 1885 – 13 July 1969) was a Bengali linguist, philologist, educationist, and writer.

In 2004, he was ranked number 16 in BBC's poll of the Greatest Bengali of all time.

Early life and education

Shahidullah was born on 10 July 1885 to a Bengali Muslim family in the village of Peyara in the erstwhile Bengal Presidency's 24 Parganas district. His father, Mafizuddin Ahmed, was the guardian of a mazar, and his mother, Marguba Khatun, was a housewife. 

Shahidullah passed his school final Entrance exam in 1904 from Howrah Zilla School. In 1906, he passed the FA exam from Presidency College in Kolkata. He received the Bachelor of Arts degree with Honours in Sanskrit in 1910 from City College, Kolkata, and Masters of Arts degree in 1912 in comparative philology from the University of Calcutta. He earned his PhD degree from Sorbonne University in 1928 for his research on the dialects of the Charyapada. He was the first Bengali Muslim to receive this doctorate degree. He was also a murid (disciple) of Mohammad Abu Bakr Siddique, the inaugural Pir of Furfura, from whom he received mystic education and khilafah (spiritual succession).

Career
Shahidullah began his career by teaching in Jessore Zila School in 1908. After working as the headmaster of Sitakunda High School for some time in 1914, he practiced law at Bashirhat in 24 Parganas. In 1915 he was elected as vice-chairman of the town's municipality. He was Sharatchandra Lahiri Research Fellow (1919–21) under Dinesh Chandra Sen at the University of Calcutta and joined the University of Dhaka as a lecturer in 1921 in Sanskrit and Bangla. During his period at the University of Dhaka he did research on the origins of the Bengali language. In 1925, he presented his thesis that Bangla as a language originated from Gaudi or Magadhi Prakrit. He was principal of Bogra Azizul Huq College from 1944 to 1948. He then returned to the University of Dhaka, serving as head of the Bangla Department and dean of the Faculty of Arts. He taught part-time at the Law Department (1922–25) and the International Relations Department as a teacher of French (1953–55). He worked as head of the Bangla and Sanskrit Department of the University of Rajshahi (1955–58).

He served as an editor for the Islami Bishwakosh project for a while.

Muhammad Shahidullah's mastery of different languages was extraordinary and outstanding.  He was fluent in 24 languages and had an outstanding knowledge of 18 languages.  Some of the notable languages are Bengali, Urdu, Persian, Arabic, English, French, Assamese, Oriya, Maithili, Hindi, Punjabi, Gujarati, Marathi, Kashmiri, Nepali, Sinhala, Tibetan, Sindhi, Sanskrit, Pali etc.

Noteworthy books
 Sindabad Saodagarer Galpa (The Stories of the Merchant Sindbad, 1922)
 Bhasa O Sahitya (Language and Literature, essays, 1931)
 Bangala Byakaran (Bangla Grammar, 1936)
 Diwan-i-Hafiz (Poems of Hafiz, translation, 1938)
 Shikwah O Jawab-i-Shikwah (Questions and Their Answers, translation from Iqbal, 1942)
 Rubaiyat-i-Omar Khaiyam (Quatrains of Omar Khayyam, translation, 1942)
 Essays on Islam (1945)
 Amader Samasya (Our Problems, essays, 1949)
 Padmavati (Volume I ed, 1950)
 Bangla Sahityer Katha (History of Bangla Literature, Volume I in 1953, Volume II in 1965)
 Vidyapati Shatak (Collection of Vidyapati's Songs, text analysis, 1954)
 Bangla Adab Ki Tarikh (History of Bangla Literature, essays, in Urdu, 1957)
 Bangla Sahityer Itihas (History of Bangla Literature, 1957)
 Bangala Bhasar Itibrtta (History of Bangla Language, 1959)
 Amarkabya (Unforgettable Poetical Works, 1963)
 Sekaler Rupkatha (Fairy Tales of Ancient Time), 1965
 Les Chants Mystiques de Kanha et de Saraha [The Mystic Songs], 1928, Adrien Maisonneuve.

Family
Shahidullah has seven sons and two daughters. Children:	
Mohammad Raziullah, 
Mohammad Safiyullah, 
Mohammad Waliullah, 
A K Mohammad Zakiyullah, 
Mohammad Taqiullah, 
Mohammad Naqiullah, 
Mohammad Bashirullah, 
Mohzuza Haque (born Khatun), 
Masrura Haque (born Khatun).

His third son A.K.M. Zakiyullah established a school named 'Dr. Shahidullah Gyanpith' in Hazi Osman Goni Road, Alu bazaar (Old Dhaka) and a research library named ’Dr. Shahidullah Memorial Library and Language Research Center’ in Senpara Parbata, Mirpur-10, Dhaka.

Another of his son Abul Bayan M. Naqiyyullah (M.S) studied in George Washington University in Washington DC, USA and settled in Cairo, Egypt after serving as a pathologist in Saudi Arabia. 
Another of Shahidullah's son, A.K.M. Bashirullah – known popularly by his alias Murtaja Baseer – is considered one of the most stylish and foremost painters in Bangladesh.

Awards and honors

Shahidullah made Professor Emeritus by the University of Dhaka (1967) for his lifetime contribution in research on language and literature. He was also awarded the Chevalier de l'Ordre des Arts et des Lettres by the French government in 1967 for his academic contribution to language and literature. In 1980, the Government of Bangladesh awarded him the Independence Award posthumously.

Eponyms
 Dr. Muhammad Shahidullah Hall
 Dr. Muhammad Shahidullah Academic Building, Rajshahi University
chandrakhetugar shahidullah smriti mahavidyalay

References

 15 https://en.wikipedia.org/w/index.php?title=Chandraketugarh_Sahidullah_Smriti_Mahavidyalaya&oldid=1096608128

External links

 

1885 births
1969 deaths
Bengali educators
Presidency University, Kolkata alumni
Translators of Omar Khayyám
Linguists from Bengal
20th-century Indian linguists
Linguists from Pakistan
Academic staff of the University of Dhaka
University of Calcutta alumni
University of Paris alumni
Recipients of the Pride of Performance
City College, Kolkata alumni
Recipients of the Independence Day Award
Chevaliers of the Ordre des Arts et des Lettres
Honorary Fellows of Bangla Academy
19th-century Bengalis
20th-century Bengalis
Bengali Muslim scholars of Islam
Writers from Dhaka
People from South 24 Parganas district
Writers from West Bengal
Bengali-language writers
Bengali writers